Kangryong Field(강령흰두루미살이터) is a 1200 ha wetland site in South Hwanghae Province of North Korea.  It has been identified by BirdLife International as an Important Bird Area (IBA) because it supports populations of Oriental storks, black-faced spoonbills, Chinese egrets, red-crowned cranes and spoon-billed sandpipers.

References

Important Bird Areas of North Korea
Wetlands of North Korea
South Hwanghae